S89 may refer to:
 S89 (New York City bus) serving Staten Island 
 County Route S89 (Bergen County, New Jersey)
 Daihatsu Hijet (S89), a kei truck and microvan